Glandon is an unincorporated community located in the town of Hewitt, Marathon County, Wisconsin, United States. William C. Landon founded the community's post office in 1908. He named the community after either his father or son who are both named G. Landon.

References

Unincorporated communities in Marathon County, Wisconsin
Unincorporated communities in Wisconsin